The Platform Sutra of the Sixth Patriarch ( or simply:  Tánjīng) is a Chan Buddhist scripture that was composed in China during the 8th to 13th century. The "platform" (施法壇) refers to the podium on which a Buddhist teacher speaks.
Its key themes are the direct perception of one's true nature, and the unity in essence of śīla (conduct), dhyāna (meditation) and prajñā (wisdom).

The text centers on teachings and stories ascribed to the sixth Chan patriarch Huineng. It contains the well-known story of the contest for the succession of Hongren (enlightenment by the non-abiding), and discourses and dialogues attributed to Huineng.

The text attributes its recollection to Fa-hai, but was probably written within the so-called Oxhead school, which existed along with the East Mountain School and Shenhui's Southern School. The text attempts to reconcile the so-called Northern School with its alleged gradual enlightenment teachings, and the so-called Southern School with its alleged sudden enlightenment teachings. In effect, the text incorporates the "rhetorical purity" which originated with Shenhui's attack on Shenxiu, while effectively "writing him out of the story".

History of the text 
The Platform Sutra underwent various redactions. Though its recollection has been attributed to Fa-hai, a student of Huineng, its origins are not clear:

The Dunhuang versions are the oldest texts available, with the full title Southern School's Sudden Doctrine, Supreme Mahayana Great Perfection of Wisdom: The Platform Sutra as Delivered by the Sixth Patriarch Huineng at the Dafan Temple in Shao Prefecture , subtitled, “one roll, recorded by the spreader of the Dharma, the disciple Fahai, who at the same time received the Precepts of Formlessness” (一卷，兼受無相戒弘法弟子法海集記).

Two copies dated to between 830 and 860 have been found in the Mogao Caves in Dunhuang. Both are thought to be based on an edition from about 780. The finds at Dunhuang have been very important for the historical understanding of Zen:

In 1056, the Chinese scholar-monk Qisong (契嵩, Wade-Giles: Ch'i-sung) produced a larger edition, entitled Liuzu fabao ji (法寶記 ‘Precious Record of the Dharma’).

In 1291, Zongbao (宗寶, Wade-Giles: Tsung-pao) produced the edition that became part of the Ming Dynasty Chinese Buddhist canon. This canonical version, apparently based on the Qisong edition, is about a third longer than the Mogao Caves version, and structured differently.

Contents
The Platform Sutra is:

Chapter One - Personal History
Chapter One contains the well-known story of the contest for the succession of Hongren. It is an essential part of the Traditional Zen Narrative. The Fifth Patriarch summoned all his followers and proposed a poem contest for his followers to demonstrate the stage of their understanding of the essence of mind. He decided to pass down his robe and teachings to the winner of the contest, who would become the Sixth Patriarch. Shenxiu, the leading disciple of the Fifth Patriarch, composed a stanza, but did not have the courage to present it to the master. Instead, he wrote his stanza on the south corridor wall to remain anonymous one day at midnight about one o'clock in the morning. The other monks saw the stanza and commended it. Shenxiu's stanza is as follows:

The Patriarch was not satisfied with Shenxiu's stanza, and pointed out that the poem did not show understanding of "[his] own fundamental nature and essence of mind." He gave Shenxiu a chance to submit another poem to demonstrate that he had entered the "gate of enlightenment," so that he could transmit his robe and the Dharma to Shenxiu, but the student's mind was agitated and could not write one more stanza.

Two days later, the illiterate Huineng heard Shenxiu's stanza being chanted by a young attendant at the monastery and inquired about the context of the poem. The attendant explained to him the poem contest and the transmission of the robe and Dharma. Huineng asked to be led to the corridor, where he could also pay homage to the stanza. He asked a low-ranking official named Zhang Riyong from Jiangzhou to read the verse to him, and then immediately asked him to write down a stanza that he composed. 

According to McRae, "the earliest version of the Platform Sutra contains two versions of Huineng's verse. Later version contain one version of Huineng's stanza, different from the two older ones:

The followers who were present were astonished by the work of a southern barbarian. Being cautious of Huineng's status, the Patriarch wiped away the stanza and claimed that the author of the stanza had not reached enlightenment.

According to the traditional interpretation, which is based on Guifeng Zongmi, the fifth-generation successor of Shenhui, the two verses represent respectively the gradual and the sudden approach. According to McRae, this is an incorrect understanding: 
Huineng's verse does not stand alone, but forms a pair with Shenxiu's verse:

McRae notes a similarity in reasoning with the Oxhead School, which used a threefold structure of "absolute, relative and middle", or "thesis-antithesis-synthesis". According to McRae, the Platform Sutra itself is the synthesis in this threefold structure, giving a balance between the need of constant practice and the insight into the absolute.

Chapter Two - Prajna (Lecture)
Chapter Two contains a lecture on prajna, given after a recitation of the Mahaprajnaparamita Sutra. From this chapter:

Chapter Three - Questions
In Chapter Three Huineng answers questions from a lay audience. Huineng discusses the famous story of Bodhidharma telling Emperor Wu of Liang that his good deeds would bring him no merit. Next, he discusses the Pure Land of the West, asserting the greater importance of one's inner state compared to one's physical location. This leads to a conclusion in which Huineng asserts that lay practice outside of a monastery is preferable to following the forms of monastic renunciation without inner practice.

Chapter Four - Meditation and Wisdom (Lecture)
In Chapter Four, meditation and wisdom are said to be of the same essence:

Chapter Five - Seated Meditation (Lecture)
Chapter Five details the "pureness of our fundamental nature":

Chapter Six - Ceremony of Repentance
Chapter Six describes a repentance-ritual.

Chapter Seven - Key Events (Encounter stories and dialogues)
Chapter Seven gives various stories of encounters and dialogues.

Chapter Eight - Immediate and Gradual (Encounter stories and dialogues)
Chapter Eight also gives various stories of encounters and dialogues.

Chapter Nine - The Imperial Summons
Chapter Nine describes the request of the Imperial Court for Huineng to visit the Emperor, and Huineng's decline of this command.

Chapter Ten - Transmission
In the chapter on his final instructions, Huineng instructs his accomplished disciples, giving specific instructions how to "preach the Dharma", which show the influence of the Buddhist teachings on the five skandhas, the concept of Namarupa, and the Yogacara-teachings:

Scholarship and translations

Japanese scholarship
In the 1920s, Japanese scholar Yabuki Keiki (矢吹慶輝 1879-1939) produced an edition based on one of the Mogao Caves texts (the only one known at the time), dividing the text into fifty-seven sections.

In 1934, D. T. Suzuki published an edition based on the Mogao Cave text, but incorporating corrections from the Tsungpao (Zongbao) edition.

In 1993, the Buddhist scholar Yang Zengwen (楊曾文, b. 1939, Shandong) published an annotated edition of the second Mogao Caves text (which has fewer errors than the first Mogao Caves text). (Pine, 2006, Introduction)

Translations into English 
The first published translation into English was completed in 1930 by Wong Mou-lam (黃茂林 -1934) from Guangdong. It was based on the canonical Tsungpao edition, and published by the Yu Ching Press of Shanghai.

The Suzuki edition was translated into English by Wing-tsit Chan in 1963 and is written in his book, A source book in Chinese Philosophy.

In 1967 Philip Yampolsky published a translation based on the Mogao Cave text. This translation is a landmark in the modern Western scholarship on Zen and its history.

Charles Luk translated the sutra as "The Dharma Treasure of the Altar Sutra of the Sixth Patriarch" which was published in Ch'an and Zen Teachings (Third Series, 1973).

John McRae translated the longer Yuan dynasty-era composite edition. It was published by Bukkyō Dendō Kyōkai.

Tripitaka Master Hsuan Hua commented on the Sixth Patriarch Sutra. The sutra and commentary were published by the Buddhist Text Translation Society as The Sixth Patriarch’s Dharma Jewel Platform Sutra (1971) 1st edition Hong Kong, (1977) 2nd edition, San Francisco, (2002) 3rd edition Burlingame,

Shoemaker & Hoard published a translation and commentary by the American writer Red Pine, based on the second Mogao Caves text, in 2006.

Martin Verhoeven and Rev. Heng Sure, disciples of Tripitaka Master Hsuan Hua, edited an edition based on the Chinese Zongbao Taisho Volume 48, Number 2008, in August 2014.

See also
 Enlightenment in Buddhism

Notes

References

Sources

Further reading

 For a close reading of the Platform Sutra's narrative, see chapter 5 of Alan Cole's Fetishizing Tradition: Desire and Reinvention in Buddhist and Christian Narratives (SUNY Press, 2015)

External links 

TheZenSite: Translations and Sutras
壇經對勘[冯焕珍老师惠赠] versions
A text based on the Dunhuang copy
Buddhist Text Translation Society

Mahayana sutras
Zen texts